Alfred Horman (11 April 1885 – 6 November 1968) was an Australian rules footballer who played for the Geelong Football Club in the Victorian Football League (VFL).

Notes

External links 

1885 births
1968 deaths
Australian rules footballers from Victoria (Australia)
Geelong Football Club players
Barwon Football Club players